Shenfield may refer to:

Shenfield, Essex
Shenfield High School, a high school located in Shenfield, Essex.
Shenfield railway station, the railway station serving Shenfield, Essex.
Shenfield to Southend Line, a railway line between Shenfield and Southend on Sea, Essex.
Lawrence L. Shenfield, advertising executive and philatelist
Shenfield (engraver), steel engraver, who engraved drawings of William Tombleson in the 1830th